Elgar: Fantasy of a Composer on a Bicycle is a 2002 British documentary film by Ken Russell who had made a film about Elgar 40 years earlier.

Cast
Louisa Nicholas as Alice, Elgar’s Daughter

References

External links

Elgar at BFI
Elgar at Letterboxd

2002 films
British documentary films
British television films
Films directed by Ken Russell
2000s English-language films
2000s British films